Hong Kong CyberU (or HKCyberU) was a virtual school developed by The Hong Kong Polytechnic University (PolyU) and PCCW in 2000. It later became the online arm of PolyU. HKCyberU adopts a ‘blended mode’ of study to combine the flexibility of web-based learning with personal guidance through face-to-face tutorials. It provides web-based programmes leading to academic awards (up to postgraduates level) offered by PolyU and other institutions in the Mainland and overseas.

The objective is to fulfil the needs of working professionals and executives in acquiring recognised university qualifications and professional education through part-time and web-based studies with maximum flexibility. HKCyberU was terminated in 2012.

History 
HKCyberU has been awarded as "The Best Wired/Virtual Campus" in 2006 (April 2006, A-Plus).

In December 2007, HKCyberU presented scholarships to its master's degree students who attained distinguished academic performance in the year 2006/07.

Programmes leading to PolyU awards
Master of/Postgraduate Diploma in Professional Accounting (offered by Graduate School of Business)
Master of Science/Postgraduate Diploma in E-Commerce (offered by Department of Computing)
Master of Science/Postgraduate Diploma in Information Systems (offered by Department of Computing)
Master of Science/Postgraduate Diploma in Knowledge Management (offered by Department of Industrial and Systems Engineering)
Master of Science/Postgraduate Diploma in Project Management (offered by Department of Building & Real Estate)
Master of Science/Postgraduate Diploma in Software Technology (jointly offered by Department of Computing and Graduate University of the Chinese Academy of Sciences)
Bachelor of Science (Honours) in Nursing (offered by School of Nursing)

Programmes leading to awards from overseas universities
Heriot-Watt University, UK
Doctor of Business Administration (DBA)
Master of Business Administration (MBA)
Master of Business Administration (Chinese version)
Master of Science in Financial Management
Master of Science in Human Resource Management
Master of Science in Marketing
Master of Science in Strategic Planning

Edith Cowan University, AU
Master of Environmental Management
Master of Security Management

The College of Estate Management, UK

Degree awarded by The University of Reading, UK
MBA in Construction & Real Estate
Master of Science in Surveying
Bachelor of Science in Building Surveying
Bachelor of Science in Construction Management
Bachelor of Science in Estate Management
Bachelor of Science in Quantity Surveying
Degree awarded by The College of Estate Management, UK
Postgraduate Diploma in Arbitration
Postgraduate Diploma in Surveying

Programmes leading to awards from the Chinese mainland
East China Normal University
Institute of Policy and Management, Chinese Academy of Sciences

Short courses
E-Quiz for Estate Agents Authority
Preparatory Course for HKCEE English
Preparatory Course for IELTS

References

External links
Official website
PolyU-HKCyberU Alumni Association

Hong Kong Polytechnic University
Hung Hom
Educational institutions established in 2000
2000 establishments in Hong Kong